Christos Kountouriotis (born 2 January 1998) is a Greek professional footballer who plays as a winger for Super League 2 club Iraklis.

Club career
He plays mainly as a winger, and joined Panathinaikos from the youth ranks of Panathinaikos. Kountouriotis made his first professional appearance for the team in the 2017–18 Superleague game against Xanthi on 17 December 2017.

References

External links
Soccerway.com

1998 births
Living people
Footballers from Athens
Greek footballers
Greek expatriate footballers
Greece youth international footballers
Association football midfielders
Panathinaikos F.C. players
Super League Greece players
MFK Zemplín Michalovce players
Slovak Super Liga players
FC Košice (2018) players
2. Liga (Slovakia) players
Olympiacos Volos F.C. players
Iraklis Thessaloniki F.C. players
Super League Greece 2 players
Expatriate footballers in Slovakia
Greek expatriate sportspeople in Slovakia